David Bornstein may refer to:

David Bornstein (author), American journalist who writes about social innovation
David Bornstein (politician) (born 1940), Australian politician
Dovid Bornsztain (1876–1942), third Rebbe of Sochatchov